San Lorenzo Martire is a Neoclassic-style Roman Catholic parish church in Lazzate, province of Monza and Brianza, region of Lombardy, Italy.

History
The church was erected in 1758. The center of the façade has a bas-relief depicting the Glory of St Lawrence.

References

18th-century Roman Catholic church buildings in Italy
Roman Catholic churches completed in 1758
Neoclassical architecture in Lombardy
Churches in the province of Monza and Brianza
Neoclassical church buildings in Italy